David Harte (born 3 April 1988) is an Ireland men's field hockey international. He captained Ireland at both the 2016 Summer Olympics and the 2018 Men's Hockey World Cup. He was also a member of the Ireland team that won the bronze medal at the 2015 Men's EuroHockey Nations Championship. At club level, he was a member of the SV Kampong team that won the 2015–16 Euro Hockey League. Harte has won national league titles in Ireland, the Netherlands and Malaysia and has played in the Hockey India League. In both 2015 and 2016 he was named the FIH Goalkeeper of the Year. Harte's twin brother, Conor, and his sister, Emer, are also Ireland field hockey internationals. The Harte brothers have lined out together with eight different field hockey teams – Bandon Grammar School, Cork Harlequins, Pembroke Wanderers, DCU, SCHC, Dabang Mumbai, Munster and Ireland.

Early years, family and education
Harte was raised in Ballinspittle, near Kinsale, West Cork. His mother was from Ballyheigue, County Kerry where his grandfather won county hurling medals. His father, Kieran Harte is a member of the prominent Tyrone GAA family. He was a goalkeeper for Tyrone in the 1972 Ulster Senior Football Championship final. Kieran's team mates on the day included his first cousin, Mickey Harte. Consequently David Harte is also a cousin of Michaela McAreavey, Mark Harte, Peter Harte and his Gaelic footballer namesake, David Harte. Harte's twin brother, Conor, is also an Ireland men's field hockey international and his sister, Emer is an Ireland women's field hockey international. In his youth Harte played gaelic games with Courcey Rovers and also played badminton and tennis. Harte was educated at Bandon Grammar School and at Dublin City University where he gained a Bachelor of Science in PE and biology and qualified to become a  teacher. He is currently studying for an MA in Sports Business from Leeds Beckett University.

Domestic teams

Bandon Grammar School
Harte began playing field hockey at the age of thirteen at Bandon Grammar School. In 2005 David and Conor Harte helped Bandon win the All Ireland Schoolboys Hockey Championship.

Cork Harlequins
While studying for their Leaving Cert at Bandon Grammar School, David and Conor Harte, also played for Cork Harlequins, helping them win the 2006 Irish Senior Cup.

Pembroke Wanderers
While studying at Dublin City University, Harte also began playing for Pembroke Wanderers. In 2008–09, together with his brother Conor, Ronan Gormley, Stuart Loughrey, Justin Sheriff, Craig Fulton and Alan Sothern, Harte was a member of the Pembroke Wanderers team that won the Irish Senior Cup, the Men's Irish Hockey League and the EuroHockey Club Trophy. While playing for Wanderers, the Harte brothers also represented DCU at intervarsity level.

SCHC
In 2010 Harte began playing for SCHC. Harte had just accepted a job offer as a PE teacher at Sutton Park School when SCHC invited him to play for them. His brother, Conor, also played for SCHC.

SV Kampong
In 2012 Harte began playing for SV Kampong. He was a member of the SV Kampong team that won the 2015–16 Euro Hockey League. In 2016–17 and 2017–18 he helped Kampong win the Hoofdklasse title.

Hockey India League
At the 2014 Hockey India League players' auction, Harte was drafted by Mumbai Magicians for $11,000. The 2015 Hockey India League season saw Harte drafted by Dabang Mumbai for $51,000. His brother Conor was also drafted by Dabang Mumbai for $10,000. Harte was retained by Dabang Mumbai for the 2016 and 2017 seasons. Dabang Mumbai retained him after paying $65,000 in the players' auction, making him the most expensive goalkeeper in the league. In 2017 Harte helped Dabang Mumbai finish as runners up in the league.

UniKL
With no Hockey India League in 2018, Harte played for UniKL in the Malaysia Hockey League, helping them win their first title. In 2019 he again played for UniKL in the Malaysia Hockey League.

Ireland international
Harte made his senior debut for Ireland in August 2006 in a Celtic Cup game against France. Harte's  brother, Conor, and his sister, Emer, also made their senior international debuts on the same day. Harte was a member of the Ireland teams that won the 2009 Men's EuroHockey Nations Trophy and the 2011 Men's Hockey Champions Challenge II. He also helped Ireland win Men's FIH Hockey World League tournaments in 2012, 2015 and 2017. He has captained the Ireland team since 2015. In 2015 Harte was named Goalkeeper of the Tournament at the World League Round 2, the World League Semifinals and the Men's EuroHockey Nations Championship. Along the way he helped Ireland qualify for the 2016 Summer Olympics and win the bronze medal at the 2015 EuroHockey Championships. He was subsequently named FIH Goalkeeper of the Year for the first time. He won the award for a second time in 2016. In June 2017 Harte was a member of the Ireland team that won the Hamburg Masters, defeating Germany 4–2 in the final.

Honours
Ireland
Hamburg Masters
Winners: 2017 
Men's FIH Hockey World League Round 1
Winners: 2012 Cardiff
Men's FIH Hockey World League Round 2
Winners: 2015 San Diego, 2017 Belfast
Runners up: 2013 New Delhi
Men's FIH Series Finals
Runners up: 2019 Le Touquet
Men's Hockey Champions Challenge II
Winners: 2011
Runners up: 2009
Men's EuroHockey Nations Trophy
Winners: 2009
Men's Field Hockey Olympic Qualifier
Runners up: 2012
Men's Hockey Investec Cup
Runners up: 2014
SV Kampong
Euro Hockey League
Winners: 2015–16
Runners up: 2017–18
Hoofdklasse
Winners: 2016–17, 2017–18
Runners up: 2014–15
UniKL
 Malaysia Hockey League
Winners: 2018, 2020
Dabang Mumbai
 Hockey India League
Runners up: 2017
Pembroke Wanderers
EuroHockey Club Trophy
Winners: 2009: 1 
Men's Irish Hockey League
Winners: 2008–09
Irish Senior Cup
Winners: 2008, 2009: 2
Cork Harlequins
Irish Senior Cup
Winners: 2006: 1
Bandon Grammar School
All Ireland Schoolboys Hockey Championship
Winners: 2005: 1 
Individual
FIH Goalkeeper of the Year
Winner: 2015, 2016

References

1988 births
Living people
Irish male field hockey players
Ireland international men's field hockey players
Male field hockey goalkeepers
Field hockey players at the 2016 Summer Olympics
Olympic field hockey players of Ireland
2018 Men's Hockey World Cup players
Pembroke Wanderers Hockey Club players
SCHC players
SV Kampong players
Men's Irish Hockey League players
Men's Hoofdklasse Hockey players
Hockey India League players
Sportspeople from County Cork
Expatriate field hockey players
Irish expatriate sportspeople in the Netherlands
Irish expatriate sportspeople in India
Irish expatriate sportspeople in Malaysia
People educated at Bandon Grammar School
Alumni of Dublin City University
Alumni of Leeds Beckett University
Irish schoolteachers
Twin sportspeople
Irish twins
David